Nusretiye Clock Tower, aka Tophane Clock Tower, is a clock tower situated in Tophane, a neighborhood in Beyoğlu district of Istanbul, Turkey next to Nusretiye Mosque and Tophane Kiosk at the European waterfront of Bosphorus. It was ordered by the Ottoman sultan Abdülmecid I (1823–1861), designed by architect Garabet Amira Balyan and completed in 1848.

Designed in neo-classical style, the four-sided, three-story clock tower is 15 m high. A tughra of Sultan Abdülmecid I is put on above the entrance. The original clock and the clock face are in a state of disrepair. The clock tower along with Nusretiye Mosque and the Tophane Kiosk survived the urban renewal and highway construction program of the mid-1950s. However, it remained within the customs warehouse area of Istanbul Port, cut off from the public access today.

See also
 List of columns and towers in Istanbul

References

External links

 Istanbul Municipality official website

Garabet Amira Balyan buildings
Buildings and structures in Istanbul
Clock towers in Turkey
Bosphorus
Neoclassical architecture in Turkey
Beyoğlu
Towers completed in 1848
1848 establishments in the Ottoman Empire
Ottoman clock towers
19th-century architecture in Turkey